Samuel Mountifort Longfield (1802 – 21 November 1884) was an Irish lawyer, judge, mathematician, and academic. He was the first Professor of Political Economy at Trinity College, Dublin.

Life
He was son of Mountifort Longfield, vicar of Desert Serges (Desert Magee), County Cork, and his wife Grace, daughter of William Lysaght of Fort William and Mount North, Co. Cork. He was educated at Trinity College Dublin, graduated as moderator and gold medallist in science in 1823, became a fellow in 1825, and proceeded to the degrees of M.A. in 1829 and LL.D. in 1831.

In 1828 Longfield was called to the Irish bar, but did not practise. When the professorship of political economy in Trinity College was founded in 1832, he was appointed the first professor; and in 1834 he resigned his fellowship and became Regius Professor of Feudal and English Law there, a post he held for the rest of his life, from 1871 having as deputy N. Ritchie, Q.C.

Longfield was reputed as a real property lawyer. In 1842 he became a Queen's Counsel, and in 1859 a bencher of the King's Inns. On the passing of the Incumbered Estates Act in 1849 he was appointed one of the three commissioners for it, holding office until the landed estates court was constituted in 1858. He became a judge of the court, and continued to sit until 1867.

A liberal in politics, Longfield helped draft the Irish measures of the first and second Gladstone administrations. In 1867 he was sworn a member of the Irish Privy Council. He was appointed a commissioner of Irish national education in 1853, and on several occasions was an assessor to the general synod of the Church of Ireland; with Joseph Galbraith he was one of the architects of the church's finances.

Longfield was an active member of the Social Science Congress and the Dublin Statistical Society. He died at 47 Fitzwilliam Square, Dublin, on 21 November 1884.

Economist
His most important work in economics was "Lectures on Political Economy", which was published in 1834. He argued against the labor theory of value and developed a marginal revenue productivity theory of labour and capital. It was unusual for its time and was only rediscovered after 1900; some of his ideas on capital and interest foreshadowed the work of the Austrian School.

His main approaches revolved around the labor theory of value, an analysis of capital and distribution theory (based on a concept of marginal productivity). He applies insofar as the representative of the marginal utility theory avant la lettre.

Works 
 Four Lectures on Poor Laws, 1834.
 
 Three Lectures on Commerce and One on Absenteeism, 1835
 An Elementary Treatise on Series, published by  Hodges, Foster & Figgis, Dublin, 1872

Family
In 1845 Longfield married Elizabeth Penelope, daughter of Andrew Armstrong.

References

Further reading 
 Joseph A. Schumpeter, History of Economic Analysis, Part 3, Chap. 4, §1 (brief summary).
 .
 E. R. A. Seligman, On Some Neglected British Economists.

External links
 Mountifort Longfield – biography – Irish economist – Encyclopædia Britannica
 
Attribution

1802 births
1884 deaths
19th-century Irish economists
19th-century Irish mathematicians
19th-century Irish lawyers
Statistical and Social Inquiry Society of Ireland
Academics of Trinity College Dublin